Crash is the fifth studio album by English synth-pop band the Human League, released on 8 September 1986 by Virgin Records. The album would provide the band with their second US number-one single, "Human", the same year. It was produced by the American production team of Jimmy Jam and Terry Lewis, who also wrote several tracks.

Background
After spending two years recording their fourth album Hysteria, which met with only moderate commercial success, the band struggled to record further material. By 1985, musician/songwriter Jo Callis had left the group. Virgin Records, worried by the lack of progress in one of their leading acts, called the band principals to a meeting where a solution was sought. As the problem was perceived to be the lack of production, it was suggested that the band take up an offer to work with Minneapolis based production duo Jimmy Jam and Terry Lewis. Jam and Lewis had written for and produced the S.O.S. Band, Cherrelle and Alexander O'Neal, and had just finished working on Janet Jackson's breakthrough album Control. They had developed an interest in the Human League after the success of their US releases; they were also seeking an opportunity to cross over into mainstream pop and saw the Human League as the perfect opportunity.

In February 1986, the Human League were flown out to Minneapolis to work at Flyte Time Studios with Jam and Lewis. After initial enthusiasm on both sides, the working relationship began to break down. Jam and Lewis had total control over the final album and insisted that their own tracks take precedence over the band's material. Jam and Lewis were also intolerant of the band's laid back working methods and their lack of musical technical ability.

After four months in Minneapolis, a sidelined Philip Oakey pulled the band out of further recording and they returned to Sheffield leaving Jam and Lewis to complete the album using session musicians. Oakey said later:

Keyboard players Philip Adrian Wright and Ian Burden also had been sidelined by Jam and Lewis. Wright would not recover from the humiliation and immediately left the band upon their return to the UK. Burden eventually quit the band in 1987.

The album name was taken from a moment in the studio during the recording. Oakey described it thus:

The album quickly became an unexpected success. One of the Jam and Lewis compositions, "Human", was released as the album's first single and became the Human League's second number-one on the US Billboard Hot 100 and their first UK top-10 single in over three years, peaking at number eight. Follow-up singles "I Need Your Loving" and the 1988 UK-only release "Love Is All That Matters" were less successful, failing to reach the UK top 40. The album itself peaked at number seven in the UK (where it has been certified Gold for shipments in excess of 100,000 copies) and number 24 on the US Billboard 200. Oakey stated his discomfort with the record in 1995, saying: "The Jam and Lewis album [Crash] was just like being a puppet for four months. It was interesting to pick yourself out of the industrial north of England and dump yourself in Minneapolis. Great experience, but it just wasn't our album."

However, in 2015, producer Jimmy Jam mentioned that the primary source of tension between the Human League and Jam and Lewis was largely due to the issue of background vocals. Jam thought Sulley and Catherall were good singers, but wanted to use them for the spoken parts on the single "Human". Jam and Lewis brought in their session vocalist Lisa Keith, who along with Lewis performed the background vocals. This caused a rift between the producers and the group, which was started by Catherall who was discussing the issue with Oakey at the time of recording Crash. Catherall did not like the idea of another female voice on the album, while Jam and Lewis thought Keith's vocals added to the songs. Jam explained:

In 2005, Crash was re-issued with extended versions of the three singles.

Artwork 
The out-of-focus cover photo was used to disguise the fact that it was taken at very short notice to meet a print deadline, after the disaster of the planned original photo shoot. Oakey originally wanted to return to the Vogue cover style of Dare artwork for Crash. He had persuaded Virgin Records to finance a studio photo shoot of the band with Vogue Paris-based photographer Guy Bourdin. The band were flown out to Paris for the two-day photo sessions. However, on arriving at Bourdin's studio, it became apparent that he was only interested in photographing the two female vocalists Susan Ann Sulley and Joanne Catherall. Matters came to a head when Bourdin ordered Sulley to do a handstand wearing a mini-skirt, a pose she considered inappropriate. After she turned on Bourdin and the two clashed angrily, the photographer refused to work with the band and they walked out of the session with the loss of all fees. Oakey would later comment that "we spent two days there, it took nine hours to set up one photograph and I daren't tell you how much money we spent."

Reception

Ken Tucker of The Philadelphia Inquirer gave the album a two stars out of four rating, stating that the groups collaboration with Jimmy Jam and Terry Lewis "should have been exciting, but instead they are merely fitfully enjoyable since the melodies are wispy and the vocals weak." AllMusic's William Ruhlmann considered Crash a collection of "songs with appealing backing tracks that maintained their dance appeal while eschewing the overtly synthesized sound of previous albums", which made it "an improvement over the lackluster Hysteria, but still not on a par with Dare." 

In the 2004 edition of The Rolling Stone Album Guide, in a review of the Human League's entire discography at the time, Crash was noted for featuring two sounds, one praised for "sounding like the Human League of yore, albeit with a better rhythm section", and the other criticised for "coming across like contemporary R&B sung by the generally soulless Oakey, Sulley, and Catherall." Of the album's ten tracks, the lead single "Human" was called a highlight for "find[ing] the perfect middle ground [between the two sounds]".

Track listing

Personnel

The Human League
 Ian Burden
 Joanne Catherall
 Philip Oakey
 Jim Russell
 Susan Ann Sulley
 Philip Adrian Wright

Additional musicians
 Paul Rabiger – keyboard parts, arrangements

Technical
 Jimmy Jam and Terry Lewis – production
 Steve Hodge – engineering
 John McClain – executive production

Artwork
 Gavin Cochrane – photograph
 The Human League – cover design, layout
 Ken Ansell – cover design, layout
 The Design Clinic – coordination

Charts

Certifications

References

External links
 The-black-hit-of-space.dk

1986 albums
A&M Records albums
Albums produced by Jimmy Jam and Terry Lewis
The Human League albums
Virgin Records albums